Xyphosia malaisei is a species of tephritid or fruit flies in the genus Xyphosia of the family Tephritidae.

Distribution
Myanmar, Thailand, Laos.

References

Tephritinae
Insects described in 1938
Diptera of Asia